Allium tribracteatum, known by the common name Threebract onion, is a species of wild onion found in California.

Distribution and habitat
The plant is endemic to California, where it is known only from the slopes of the Sierra Nevada in Tuolumne and Calaveras Counties.

Description
Allium tribracteatum is a small onion plant producing a stem only a few centimeters long from an oval-shaped bulb. There are two leaves which are usually much longer than the stem. The inflorescence contains up to 30 petite white to purple flowers, each less than a centimeter long. Tepals are white to pink with red or purple midveins; anthers purple; pollen gray. Flowers bloom March to May.

References

External links

tribracteatum
Endemic flora of California
Flora of the Sierra Nevada (United States)
Natural history of the California chaparral and woodlands
Natural history of Calaveras County, California
Natural history of Tuolumne County, California
Onions
Taxa named by John Torrey
Threatened flora of California